Anthony Mountain King (born 8 October 1932 in Laughton-en-le-Morthern, West Riding of Yorkshire, England) is an English first-class cricketer, who played one match for Yorkshire County Cricket Club in 1955. A right-handed batsman, he scored 12 in his only innings against Derbyshire. Yorkshire won by an innings and 94 runs in two days. He also appeared for the Yorkshire Second XI in that year.

References

External links
Cricket Archive
Cricinfo

1932 births
Living people
Yorkshire cricketers
English cricketers
People from the Metropolitan Borough of Rotherham
Cricketers from Yorkshire